The non-marine molluscs of Chile are part of the molluscan fauna of Chile (wildlife of Chile).

A number of species of non-marine molluscs are found in the wild in Chile.

Freshwater gastropods 
Freshwater gastropods include:

Tateidae
 Potamopyrgus antipodarum (Gray, 1843)

Planorbidae
 Uncancylus foncki (Philippi, 1866)

Land gastropods 

Charopidae
 Stephacharopa calderaensis Miquel & Araya, 2013
 Lilloiconcha lopezi Araya & Aliaga, 2015

Ellobiidae
 Marinula pepita King, 1832
 Sarnia frumentum (Petit de Saussaye, 1842)

Macrocyclidae
Macrocyclis peruvianus Lamarck, 1822

Pupillidae
 Pupoides minimus (Philippi, 1860)

Strophocheilidae
 Chiliborus bridgesii (Pfeiffer, 1842)
 Chiliborus pachychilus (Pfeiffer, 1842)
 Chiliborus rosaceus (King & Broderip I, 1831)

Helicidae
 Cornu aspersum (Müller, 1774) - non-indigenous

Orthalicidae

genus Bostryx - 29 species
 Bostryx affinis (Broderip, 1832)
 Bostryx anachoreta (Pfeiffer, 1856)
 Bostryx ancavilorum (Araya, 2015)
 Bostryx albicans (Broderip, 1832)
 Bostryx anachoreta (Pfeiffer, 1856)
 Bostryx breurei (Araya, 2015)
 Bostryx calderaensis (Araya, 2015)
 Bostryx derelictus (Broderip, 1832)
 Bostryx eremothauma (Pilsbry, 1896)
 Bostryx erosus (Broderip, 1832)
 Bostryx erythrostoma (Sowerby, 1833)
 Bostryx gayi (Rehder, 1945)
 Bostryx guttatus (Broderip, 1832)
 Bostryx hennahi (Gray, 1830)
 Bostryx holostoma (Pfeiffer, 1856)
 Bostryx huascensis (Reeve, 1848)
 Bostryx ireneae (Araya, 2015)
 Bostryx ischnus (Pilsbry, 1902)
 Bostryx koehleri Walther & Gryl, 2019
 Bostryx lactifluus (Pfeiffer, 1856)
 Bostryx leucostictus (Philippi, 1856)
 Bostryx lichenorum (Orbigny, 1835)
 Bostryx mejillonensis (Pfeiffer, 1857)
 Bostryx metamorphus (Pilsbry, 1896)
 Bostryx philippii (Rehder, 1945)
 Bostryx pruinosus (Sowerby, 1833)
 Bostryx pumilio (Rehder, 1945)
 Bostryx pupiformis (Broderip, 1833)
 Bostryx pustulosus (Broderip, 1832)
 Bostryx rhodacme (Pfeiffer, 1843)
 Bostryx rouaulti (Hupé, 1854)
 Bostryx scabiosus (Sowerby, 1833)
 Bostryx valdovinosi (Araya, 2015)
 Bostryx variabilis Herm, 1970
 Bostryx voithianus (Pfeiffer, 1847)

Bothriembryontidae

genus Plectostylus - 12 species
 Plectostylus araucanus Valdovinos & Stuardo, 1988
 Plectostylus broderipii (Sowerby I, 1832)
 Plectostylus chilensis (Lesson, 1831)
 Plectostylus coquimbensis (Broderip, 1832)
 Plectostylus coturnix (Sowerby I, 1832)
 Plectostylus elegans (Pfeiffer, 1842)
 Plectostylus moestai (Dunker, 1864)
 Plectostylus ochsneri (Dunker, 1856)
 Plectostylus peruvianus (Bruguière, 1789)
 Plectostylus punctulifer (Sowerby I, 1833)
 Plectostylus reflexus (Pfeiffer, 1842)
 Plectostylus vagabondiae Brooks, 1936
 Plectostylus variegatus (Pfeiffer, 1842)

Bivalvia

See also
 List of marine molluscs of Chile

Lists of molluscs of surrounding countries:
 List of non-marine molluscs of Peru, Wildlife of Peru
 List of non-marine molluscs of Bolivia, Wildlife of Bolivia
 List of non-marine molluscs of Argentina, Wildlife of Argentina

References

External links 
 Biese W. A. (1960). "Revision der Land-und Süβwasser-Mollusken von Chile. Land-Mollusken I." Archiv für Molluskenkunde 89(4): 133–139.
 Vargas-Almonacid P. & Stuardo J. R. (2007). "Dos géneros nuevos de caracoles terrestres (Stylommatophora: Arionacea) de Chile". Revista de Biología Tropical 55: 693–708. HTM.

Non
Non Marine
Chile, Non
Chile, Non
Chile
Chile